Millie Criswell (born March 26, 1948) is a best-selling author of over twenty-five romance novels.

She began writing shortly before her fortieth birthday, after decades of reading romances. She has since published over twenty-five novels, and is the lead author for the new Harlequin Flipside line. She and her husband live in Spotsylvania, Virginia; they have a daughter and a son.

Awards
Romantic Times Career Achievement Award winner
National Readers Choice Award winner
Reviewer's Choice Award winner
Georgia Romance Writers MAGGIE award winner
Dorothy Parker Award of Excellence winner

Bibliography
Italian Series (Modern)
The Trouble With Mary
What to Do About Annie
The Trials of Angela
 Mad About Mia

The Law Man Trilogy
Desperate Rafe and Emma
Dangerous Ethan 
Defiant Travis

Flowers of the West Trilogy
Wild Heather Book 1
Sweet LaurelBook 2
Prim Rose Book 3
Asking for Trouble
No Strings Attached
Body Language
Suddenly Single
The Trials of Angela
Staying Single
Christmas Eve
The Pregnant Miss Potter
The Marrying Man
The Wedding Planner
True Love

20th-century American novelists
21st-century American novelists
American romantic fiction writers
American women novelists
Living people
Place of birth missing (living people)
Novelists from Virginia
1948 births
20th-century American women writers
21st-century American women writers